Because Music is an independent record label with headquarters in Paris and London. Because Music SAS is the main label, with Because Music Ltd handling the British artist roster.

Because Music was founded in 2005 by former president of Virgin Records France and EMI Continental Europe Emmanuel de Buretel, and has acts on its roster such as Mercury Music Prize nominated Metronomy and electronic duo Justice, along with actress and songwriter Charlotte Gainsbourg and husband-and-wife duo Amadou & Mariam.

It holds an exclusive license for all artists on Ed Banger Records and Phantasy. Because Music is the distributor for select Atlantic Records subsidiaries like Big Beat and 300 Entertainment.

In 2017, Because acquired the catalogues of over 60 artists from Warner Music Group, including Mano Negra, The Beta Band, and most of London Records.

In January 2018, Because signed a deal with Caroline Distribution (now Virgin Music Label & Artist Services) (a Universal Music division) for distribution of Because's releases starting in 2019. Before, the distribution was held by Warner Music's Alternative Distribution Alliance and Vice Records.

Artists

 Amadou et Mariam
 The Beta Band
 Boston Bun
 Brandt Brauer Frick
 Breakbot
 Busy P
 Calypso Rose
 Cassius
 Catherine Ringer
 Cerrone
 Charlotte Gainsbourg
 Charlotte Dos Santos
 Christine and the Queens
 Connan Mockasin
 Denai Moore
 Diplo
 DJ Mehdi
 DJ Pone
 Django Django
 Duck Sauce
 Electric Guest
 Fredo Viola
 J. J. Cale
 Jeshi
 Justice
 Kap Bambino
 Keziah Jones
 Les Plastiscines
 Logic1000
 London Grammar
 Les Rita Mitsouko
 Lido
 London Music Stream's catalogue
 Major Lazer
 Manu Chao
 Metronomy
 Moby
 Mr. Flash
 Mr. Oizo
 Myd
 Nortec Collective
 Para One
 Ratatat
 Riton
 SebastiAn
 Selah Sue
 Seun Kuti
 Shygirl
 Soko
 Syd Matters
 The Blood Arm
 Uffie
 Yelle
 Zhu

References

External links
 Official website 

French independent record labels
Indie rock record labels
Record labels established in 2005
2005 establishments in France